Paraone Brown Reweti  (17 November 1916 – 21 April 1996) was a New Zealand politician and Rātana morehu.

Early life
Of Ngāti Ranginui ancestry, Reweti came to Parliament from a position as an executive member of the Mount Maunganui Watersiders' Union.

Political career

Reweti won the Eastern Maori electorate for Labour, in the  following the death of Puti Tipene Watene. He held the electorate until 1981, when he retired.

From 1973 to 1975, during the Third Labour Government, he was chairman of the parliamentary Māori Affairs Committee. In January 1976 he was appointed by Labour leader Bill Rowling as Shadow Minister of Marine.

In the 1990 Queen's Birthday Honours, Reweti was appointed a Companion of the Queen's Service Order for public services.

References

1916 births
1996 deaths
Ngāti Ranginui people
New Zealand Labour Party MPs
New Zealand Rātanas
People from Mount Maunganui
New Zealand trade unionists
New Zealand MPs for Māori electorates
Members of the New Zealand House of Representatives
Companions of the Queen's Service Order
20th-century New Zealand politicians